María (and Everybody Else) is a 2016 Spanish comedy film directed by  starring Bárbara Lennie.

Cast

Production 
The film is a Frida Films, Promo Allanda and Avalon P.C. production.

Release 
Distributed by Avalon Distribución, the film was theatrically released in Spain on 7 December 2016.

See also 
 List of Spanish films of 2016

References

External links 

2016 comedy films
Spanish comedy films
Avalon films
2010s Spanish films
2010s Spanish-language films